Honorary Canadian citizenship (French: citoyenneté canadienne honoraire) is an honour bestowed on foreigners of exceptional merit following a joint resolution by both Houses of the Parliament of Canada. 

Honorary Canadian citizenship is purely symbolic; the recipient does not receive any of the rights, privileges, or duties typically held by a Canadian citizen.

Recipients of honorary Canadian citizenship
 Honorary Canadian citizenship revoked by parliamentary vote

Revocations
Canadian civil society groups and other protestors called for the revocation of Aung San Suu Kyi's honorary citizenship in response to UN allegations that the 2017 persecution by the Burmese military against the Rohingya, an ethno-religious minority group in Burma, was a form of ethnic cleansing. This included an online Change.org petition addressed to Prime Minister Justin Trudeau and the House of Commons of Canada. The House of Commons voted unanimously on September 27, 2018, to revoke her honorary citizenship. The Senate of Canada approved a motion to the same effect unanimously on October 2, 2018. With revocation motions passed by both houses, the Government of Canada stated that it recognized Parliament's decision to revoke the honour.

See also
 Citizenship
 Honorary citizenship of the United States

Notes

References

Canada
Canadian awards
Canadian nationality law